William Henry Barth (December 13, 1942, New York City –  July 14, 2000, Amsterdam, Netherlands) was an American blues guitarist who, along with John Fahey and Henry Vestine, located 1930s blues great Skip James in a hospital in Tunica, Mississippi in 1964.

The Insect Trust
In the late 1960s Barth was a founding member of the band The Insect Trust.

Memphis Country Blues Society
Barth co-founded the Memphis Country Blues Society, a non-profit organization dedicated to the preservation and promotion of the Delta blues.  With the Country Blues Society, Bill produced five festivals between 1966 and 1970 featuring artists such as Furry Lewis, Gus Cannon, Bukka White, Sleepy John Estes, Yank Rachell and Fred McDowell.

Discography
1969 Memphis Swamp Jam (originally on Blue Thumb Records, later reissued on the Arhoolie label: Three guitar duets by John Fahey, and Bill Barth, using the pseudonyms of  R L Watson and Josiah Jones)
1971-74 'On The Road Again' Country Blues 1969-1974 (FLYCD58 Interstate Music) Bill backs various blues musicians on tracks 13,14 and plays second guitar with Lum Guffin on track 16.
John Fahey Vol. III: The Dance of Death & Other Plantation Favorites (TAKOMA C 1004)  Duet with Fahey on track 3, "On the Banks of the Owchita". Barth recorded other tracks with Fahey which were not used.

With The Insect Trust
 1969 The Insect Trust
 1970 Hoboken Saturday Night

References

 Gordon, Robert.: It Came From Memphis  pages 117, 124, 127, 138, 14, 145, 147, 192, (1995, 2001 ed) 
Charters, Sam.: The Blues Makers (1991).
 Calt, Stephen.: I'd Rather be the Devil: Skip James and the Blues pages 242, 272, 278, 313, (1994, 2008 ed) .
 La Gorce, Tammy.: Throwing Rock Snobs a Bone,  The New York Times Sunday December 18, 2005. Section 14NJ; Column 4; New Jersey Weekly Desk; Music; Pg. 14.

External links
 https://www.mtzionmemorialfund.org/2018/07/nathan-beauregard-was-born-blind.html?m=1* "The Real True Story of How I Found Nathan Beauregard and Got Him to Play Music Again"

1942 births
2000 deaths
American blues guitarists
American male guitarists
20th-century American guitarists
20th-century American male musicians